Enrique Abaroa Castellanos is a landscape artist and urban architect from Monterrey, Mexico. Some of the most famous large-scale projects he has worked on are the Santa Lucia Riverwalk, the design of the Fundidora Park, la Casa de Cursillos de Cristiandad San Pedro, and Parque de Investigación e Innovación Tecnológico (PITT) His work can be seen in Nuevo Leon and Mexico.

Renewable energy company
Grupo Desus is a renewable energy company based in the city of Monterrey in Nuevo León, Mexico that originated in 1970 "under the impulse" of Castellanos.

References

Architects from Monterrey
Living people
Year of birth missing (living people)